Harapanahalli is a city and sub-divisional headquarter of Harapanahalli, HuvinaHadagali, and Kotturu Taluks; and the headquarter of Harapanahalli taluk in the Vijayanagara district. it is the second largest and fastest growing city/town in the Vijayanagara district in the Indian state of Karnataka. The famous Kannada humorist "Beechi" (Rayasam Bheemasena Rao) was born here. the place which connects Kalyana Karnataka with Middle Karnataka, Harapanahalli have a very frequent transport connectivity, water facility and a 
good education from Pre KG to Master's and it was the main revenue, trading and educational center since from Madras Presidency.

Geography
It has an Average Elevation of 633 metres (2076 feet) away from the sea level. Harapanahalli is surrounded by several districts like Davanagere in the South, Chithradurga in the Southeast, Haveri in the West. Harapanahalli had worked under Bellari, Davanagere districts and Now it is working under Vijayanagara District.
"Haripura" was the old name of Harapanahalli and it has an AC Office. It had 81 villages in its taluk boundary, and it is one of the oldest high revenue, high trading and educational outposts since the Madras Presidency.

Demographics
 India census, Harapanahalli had a population of 41,889. Males constituted 52% of the population and females 48%. Harapanahalli had an average literacy rate of 55%, lower than the national average of 59.5%: male literacy was 60%, and female literacy was 48%. 14% of the population was under 6 years of age.

Transportation

Roadway Transportation 

Harapanahalli had a good bus connectivity with a many state highways like SH-25 Shivamogga-Hosapete is a major state highway in the state and it is proposed to Upgrade as a National highway, SH-02, SH-47 & SH-150 are lied through the city. and intiated with a KKRTC formally (NEKRTC) had a bus Depot of Hosapete Division, and KSRTC and NWKRTC buses are operated to here. small enough bus stand at center part of the city. The bus services are being provided to most of the villages of Harapanahalli, Davanagere, Hadagali, Haveri, Ranebennur, Kudligi, Hagaribommanahalli and Harihara taluks regions. the buses are operated to Bengaluru, Hyderabad, Mangaluru, Mantralayam, Srisailam, Kalaburgi, Vijayapura, Madikeri, Subrahmanya, Dharmasthala, Bellary, Panjim, Mysore, Hubli, Bidar, Bagalkot,  Sholhapur, Gadag, Haveri, Karwar,  Raichur,  Sindhanur, Kundapur etc.

Railway Transportation 
Harapanahalli has a railway line passing through the city. The railway station is called Harapanahalli Railway Station (Station Code: HPHI) which is within the city limits. It is a single track diesel line. and it lies between Hosapete - Davanagere section of South Western Railways of Mysuru division. Now 6 trains are passing through this station. New survey of Gadag Junction - Harapanahalli 93 km railway line project physical survey is completed report submitted to SWR board UBL(Hubli) & it was considered.

Airway Transportation
The nearest Airport to Harapanahalli is Jindal Vijayanagara Airport (IATA:VDY) is at Toranagallu. which is at a distance of around 94 km along the fastest route. Flights are available from here to all the major Indian metropolis cities like Bengaluru, Hyderabad, Mumbai, Mangaluru, Panajim, and Hubli. The Hubli Airport (IATA:HBX) is 152 km far and The Kempegowda International airport (IATA:BLR) Bengaluru is 302 km far from here.

Education
There are several private and government primary and high schools of state syllabus and the only one CBSE school available in Harapanahalli city. Government Girl's high school had a record in admission for more than 1,000(1K) girls only for 8-10 classes allover in surrounding districts, and the whole state, college level educational institutions 4 PU colleges which includes both science, commerce and arts, UG level include a pharmacy in B. Pharmacy, B.Sc. in nursing, M. Pharmacy and research (Ph.D.) in pharmacy PG level. Several colleges with government polytechnic, many ITI colleges and 5 degree colleges in Harapanahalli city limits and many more over in the taluk boundary and many students are from surrounding taluk's, district's and different state's too.

See also
Neelagunda, Harapanahalli
Bagali
Chigateri
Arasikere
Teligi
Hulikatti

References

Cities and towns in Vijayanagara district